Beautiful Accident is a 2017 Taiwanese comedy-drama film directed by Ho Wi Ding and co-produced by Chen Kun. The film stars Gwei Lun-mei, Chen Kun, Wang Jingchun, Ouyang Nana, and William Wang. It is a remake of the 2015 South Korean film Wonderful Nightmare.

Plot
A single and career-driven lawyer is given a second chance in life following a fatal car crash. In the span of seven days, she finds herself taking on a new life where she assumes the role of a housewife, taking care of her architect husband and two children.

Cast
Gwei Lun-mei as Li Yuran
Wang Jingchun as Station master 
Ouyang Nana as Xing Xing 
William Wang as Tian Tian
Joy Pan as Qian's mom
Hsieh Ying-xuan as Ms Zhao 
Peggy Tseng

Special appearance
Chen Kun as Zhang Tao / Zhang Yijun

Soundtrack

Featured song

Awards and nominations

References

External links

Chinese fantasy comedy-drama films
2010s fantasy comedy-drama films
Huayi Brothers films
Films about the afterlife
Films scored by Robin Coudert
Chinese remakes of South Korean films
Films directed by Ho Wi Ding
2017 comedy-drama films